The Thai language has many borrowed words from mainly Sanskrit, Tamil, Pali and some Prakrit, Khmer, Portuguese, Dutch, certain Chinese dialects and more recently, Arabic (in particular many Islamic terms) and English (in particular many scientific and technological terms). Some examples as follows:

There are some Thai words which are transcribed into equivalent characters of Thai language  e.g. format ฟอร์แมท (f-ฟ o-อ r-ร m-ม a-แ t-ต), lesbian เลสเบียน (l-ล e-เ s-ส b-บ ia-เอีย n-น) etc. These words are transcribed with rules made by the Royal Institute.

Thai also has a heavily influenced form of colloquial English spoken by some in Thailand (Tinglish). However, it's not a language used between locals, it is only used with tourists.

Thai language
Thai